Igor Fyodorovich Khankeyev (born 4 February 1968) is a Russian professional football coach and a former player.

Club career
He made his professional debut in the Soviet Second League in 1985 for FC Irtysh Omsk. He then played for SKA Novosibirsk (1987-1988), FC Irtysh Omsk (1989-1990), FC Uralmash Yekaterinburg (1991-1996), FC Rostselmash Rostov-on-Don (1997-2000), FC Volgar-Gazprom Astrakhan (2001), FC Lokomotiv Nizhny Novgorod (2001), and FC Bataysk (amateur) (2001). He finished his playing career with FC Irtysh Omsk in 2002, where he made 22 appearances and scored 1 goal.

After retiring as a player, Khankeyev moved into coaching and worked as an assistant manager at several clubs including FC Ural Yekaterinburg (2003-2004), FC Petrotrest St. Petersburg (2005-2006), FC Taganrog (2006-2008), and FC Dynamo St. Petersburg (2014). He also managed FC SKA Rostov-on-Don (2009-2012), FC Donenergo Aksay (2013), and FC Fakel Voronezh (2014-2017).

In conclusion, Igor Khankeyev had a successful football career as both a player and coach. He played for several clubs across Russia and helped many teams as a coach.

European club competitions
 UEFA Intertoto Cup 1996 with FC Uralmash Yekaterinburg: 4 games, 1 goal.
 UEFA Intertoto Cup 1999 with FC Rostselmash Rostov-on-Don: 4 games, 1 goal.
 UEFA Intertoto Cup 2000 with FC Rostselmash Rostov-on-Don: 1 game.

References

1968 births
Sportspeople from Omsk
Living people
Soviet footballers
Russian footballers
Association football midfielders
FC Irtysh Omsk players
FC Ural Yekaterinburg players
FC Rostov players
FC Volgar Astrakhan players
FC Lokomotiv Nizhny Novgorod players
Russian Premier League players
Russian football managers
FC SKA Rostov-on-Don managers